Bayanaul can refer to:

Bayanaul, the capital of Bayanaul District, Kazakhstan  
Bayanaul District, a district in Pavlodar Region, Kazakhstan
Bayanaul Range, a mountain range of the Kazakh Uplands
Bayanaul National Park, a protected area in the range